State Route 313 (SR 313) is a secondary state highway mostly in Bradley County but also in Polk County. Although it is signed as an east-west highway, it actually runs diagonally on a northwest-southeast axis.

Route description
SR 313 is known as Ladd Springs Road its entire length. It begins at an intersection  with US 411 (SR 33) in southeastern Polk County in the unincorporated community of Old Fort. About a mile later it crosses into Bradley County. SR 313 continues for several miles through a rural and mostly agricultural area before reaching its terminus with SR 74 in the census designated place of Wildwood Lake. This is about four miles southeast of Cleveland.

Major intersections

References

313
Transportation in Bradley County, Tennessee
Transportation in Polk County, Tennessee